Lance Dae Lim (born December 16, 2000) is an American actor known for his roles as Zack Kwan on the Nickelodeon television series School of Rock and as Runyen on the NBC TV series Growing Up Fisher.

Life and career 

Lim was born and raised in Los Angeles, California. He is of Korean descent. Prior to his breakout role on Growing Up Fisher, he competed on South Korea's MBC's Star Audition. Lim has portrayed recurring roles on various television series such as Fresh Off The Boat, Speechless and Splitting Up Together. In 2018, Netflix released their original animated feature Duck Duck Goose, in which Lim voiced Chao. In 2019, he was cast in the pilot The Edge of Seventeen and in the Netflix's feature Hubie Halloween.

Filmography

References

External links

Male actors from Los Angeles
Living people
American male child actors
American male film actors
American male television actors
American male actors of Korean descent
2000 births
21st-century American male actors